Vladimir Petrovich Ivanov (5 June 1920 – 16 June 1996) was a Soviet and Russian radio engineer. After graduating in 1945 from Zhukovsky Air Force Engineering Academy, he spent his entire career on developing radio equipment at Moscow research institutes. Since 1979 he headed the Tikhomirov Scientific Research Institute of Instrument Design. 

As a senior designer, Ivanov led the development of radar altimeter, which controlled the landing of Luna 9. Thanks to that altimeter Luna 9 became the first spacecraft to achieve a survivable landing on a celestial body (the Moon). Ivanov also developed radars for the early warning and control aircraft Tupolev Tu-126 and Beriev A-50. 

He was married to Galina Ivanova (1924–2014).

References

1920 births
1996 deaths
20th-century Russian engineers
People from Volgograd
Stalin Prize winners
Recipients of the Order of Lenin
Recipients of the Order of the Red Banner of Labour
Recipients of the USSR State Prize
Russian aerospace engineers
Soviet aerospace engineers